The Ippari, anciently called the Hipparis is a  long river located in the province of Ragusa in south-eastern Sicily.

The river passes near the towns of Comiso and Vittoria. The ruins of the ancient Greek city of Kamarina, which used the river as a Canal-port, can be found on the southern bank.

Nature reserve
The lower half of its course lies in The Pino d'Aleppo Nature Reserve.

Notes

Rivers of Italy
Rivers of Sicily
Rivers of the Province of Ragusa
European drainage basins of the Mediterranean Sea